The McEwen Stakes, registered as the Ian McEwen Trophy, is a Moonee Valley Racing Club Group 2 Thoroughbred horse race for horses aged three years old and over at Weight for age, over a distance of 1000 metres at Moonee Valley Racecourse, Melbourne, Australia in September.

History
The race was named in honour of former Moonee Valley Racing Club Secretary Ian McEwen.

Distance
1995 onwards held over 1000 metres

Grade
1995–1997 - Unlisted race
1997–2005 - Listed Race
2006–2012 - Group 3
2013 onwards - Group 2

Name
 1995 - The Anniversary Trophy
1996–2005 - Ian McEwen Trophy
2006 onwards -  McEwen Stakes

Venue

 1995 - Caulfield Racecourse
 2007 - Caulfield Racecourse

Winners

 2022 - Rothfire
 2021 - The Inferno 
 2020 - Bella Vella 
 2019 - Faatinah 
 2018 - Nature Strip 
 2017 - Russian Revolution 
 2016 - Wild Rain 
 2015 - Chautauqua
 2014 - Angelic Light
 2013 - Kuroshio
 2012 - Bel Sprinter
 2011 - Buffering
 2010 - Hay List
 2009 - Nicconi
 2008 - Kaphero
 2007 - Here De Angels
 2006 - Miss Andretti
 2005 - Strikeline
 2004 - Edgeton
 2003 - Yell
 2002 - Mistegic
 2001 - Strategic Image
 2000 - Testa Rossa
 1999 - Theatre
 1998 - Flavour
 1997 - Another Excuse
 1996 - Red Hope
 1995 - Sequalo

See also
 List of Australian Group races
 Group races

References

Horse races in Australia
Open sprint category horse races